"Request + Line" is a song recorded by American group Black Eyed Peas for their second studio album Bridging the Gap (2000). The song features vocals from Macy Gray. It was released as the third and final single from Bridging the Gap on January 30, 2001, by Interscope Records.

"Request + Line" became the group's first top-40 hit in numerous countries, reaching the top ten in New Zealand, and became their first entry on the US Billboard Hot 100, peaking at number 63.

Music video
The music video was directed by Joseph Kahn. The video begins with flashing objects, a phone picking up, and a flashing sign saying "On Air". The video features Macy Gray behind a turntable. The three members of the Black Eyed Peas are seen on a giant turntable, in a bathroom with a transparent shower bath, toilet and sink, and sitting with Macy Gray on a sofa.

Track listing
 United Kingdom
 "Request + Line" - 3:53
 "Request + Line" (Trackmasters Remix) - 3:50
 "Joints & Jam" (The Joint Mix) - 3:37
 "Request + Line" (Music Video)

 America
 "Request + Line" - 3:53
 "Request + Line" (Instrumental) - 3:56 
 "Request + Line" (Trackmasters Remix) - 3:51
 "Request + Line" (Will.I.Am Remix) - 4:22

Charts

Release history

References

2000 songs
2001 singles
Macy Gray songs
Music videos directed by Joseph Kahn
Songs written by Rhett Lawrence
Black Eyed Peas songs
Interscope Records singles
Songs written by George Pajon
Songs written by will.i.am
Songs written by apl.de.ap
Alternative hip hop songs
Song recordings produced by Rhett Lawrence